Sintex group, formerly known as The Bharat Vijay Mills Ltd and Sintex Industries Ltd, is the world's largest producer of plastic water tanks and Asia's largest manufacturer of corduroy fabrics. Sintex operates in Europe, America, Africa, and Asia, especially in France, Germany, and the US. It primarily works with building materials, textiles, prefabricated structures, custom molding products, monolithic construction and water storage tanks.

History (founding to demerger)
Bharat Vijay Mills Limited was incorporated in June 1931 and started a composite textile mill in Kalol, Gujarat that same year. In 1975 it was renamed Sintex Industries Limited and was listed on the Mumbai Stock Exchange in 2000.

Sintex expanded significantly in the 2000s, including the acquisition of U.S.-based Wausaukee Composites. In 2007 the offshore holdings segment, Sintex Holdings BV Netherlands, acquired the automotive branch of Bright Brothers Ltd to form Bright Autoplast, also called Sintex-BAPL, and the French company Nief Plastics was acquired, to be later renamed Sintex NP. In 2015 Bright Autoplast signed onto a joint venture with Rototech Group to expand its coverage of automotive applications, calling the joint unit BAPL Rototech.

In 2017 Sintex demerged, with its textiles business remaining under the name Sintex Industries Limited, while the plastics and prefab side became Sintex Plastics Technology Limited.

Sintex Industries Limited
Despite strong initial showings after the demerger, in June 2019 Sintex Industries was downgraded by CARE Ratings to "issuer non-cooperating" and defaulted on non-convertible debentures from Punjab National Bank. Another default later that year precipitated a plea by Invesco Asset Management in December 2020 and Sintex Industries entered bankruptcy in April 2021.

Sintex Plastics Technology Limited
Sintex began a campaign called ReviveOurRivers in October 2017 encouraging people to make a pledge to keep rivers clean.

In August 2019, Sintex Plastics sold the entirety of subsidiary Sintex NP SAS to XTECH Invest. The French unit was known as Nief Plastic SA before Sintex acquired it in 2007.

In March 2021, Sintex Plastics reported a major fire at the Sanaswadi plant, part of the Sintex-BAPL material subsidiary.

References

External links
After Durha buyout, Sintex to bid for BOT projects

Plastics companies of India
Companies based in Gujarat
Manufacturing companies of India
Manufacturing companies established in 1931
Indian companies established in 1931
Companies listed on the Bombay Stock Exchange